Clarence Albert Pierce, Jr. (born October 1, 1928) is an American politician in the state of Mississippi. He served in the Mississippi House of Representatives from 1952 to 1984.  He was a teacher and farmer. He attended the University of Mississippi, graduating in 1950. Pierce served as an assistant to Senator James Eastland when the Mississippi House was not in session.

References

1928 births
Living people
People from Holmes County, Mississippi
People from Vaiden, Mississippi
University of Mississippi alumni
Democratic Party members of the Mississippi House of Representatives